Saratoga Township may refer to:

 Saratoga Township, Howard County, Arkansas, in Howard County, Arkansas
 Saratoga Township, Grundy County, Illinois
 Saratoga Township, Marshall County, Illinois
 Saratoga Township, Howard County, Iowa
 Saratoga Township, Winona County, Minnesota
 Saratoga Township, Holt County, Nebraska
 Saratoga Township, Wilson County, North Carolina, in Wilson County, North Carolina
 Saratoga Township, LaMoure County, North Dakota, in LaMoure County, North Dakota
 Saratoga Township, Faulk County, South Dakota, in Faulk County, South Dakota

Township name disambiguation pages